Barbara Oldfield (born 1 August 1950) is a former Australian professional squash player.

Oldfield was born on 1 August 1950 and lived in Perth, Australia. She did not start playing squash until aged 21 but became a leading player representing Australia in the 1981 World Team Squash Championships.

References

External links
 

1950 births
Living people
Australian female squash players